Stephen Hare (born April 1961) is a British businessman and chief executive officer of the multinational enterprise software company Sage Group.

Early life 
Hare was born in Withernsea, East Riding of Yorkshire in 1961 and when he was six the family moved to Hong Kong. At age 11 they returned to the UK and Hare attended a boarding school in Pocklington, Yorkshire. Hare studied economics and accountancy at Liverpool University, and afterwards he joined the auditing firm Ernst & Young.

Career 
Hare joined General Electric Company in 1989 and had a number of roles eventually becoming chief financial officer (CFO) of its successor, Marconi plc. After leaving Marconi, Hare took up CFO roles at Spectris plc from 2005 to 2006 and Invensys from 2006 to 2009. Hare then became a partner at Apax Partners from 2009 to 2013.

In 2014 Hare joined Sage Group as CFO. During his time as CFO, Sage made its biggest acquisition, Intacct, in July 2017 for $850M.

On 31 August 2018, Sage announced that the board and the then current Sage CEO, Stephen Kelly, had come to an agreement and that Kelly had stepped down as a director and CEO. Immediately following Kelly's departure Hare was appointed chief operating officer on an interim basis. On 2 November 2018 Steve Hare was appointed CEO on a full-time basis. In a 2020 poll Glassdoor named Hare the UK's number 1 CEO during the COVID-19 pandemic.

References

External links 
 
 Sage

Living people
1961 births
Sage Group people
British businesspeople